The Legend of the Lost Keys is an educational BBC Look and Read production, which first aired on BBC Two from 12 January to 23 March 1998, and was repeated on BBC Two until 2007.

Plot

Whilst on holiday, twins, Mark and Lisa, discover that their Uncle George is the guardian of an ancient box, which is a gateway to the world of Heritron. When the box is stolen by scientists, George worries that the evil leaders of Heritron are trying to break through to Earth and it's up to the twins to help get the box back.

Characters and cast

Episodes

Media release 
The series was released on VHS videotape, CD, and later on DVD, and the story also appeared in book format.

Book
The book version was written by Jim Eldridge and published by BBC Books in 1998.

VHS

DVD

CD-ROM

References

External links 

Official DVD BBC Shop
Official DVD BBC Shop
Broadcast for Schools
Look and Read.myby

1998 British television series debuts
1998 British television series endings
1990s British children's television series
BBC children's television shows
British television shows for schools
Look and Read
Reading and literacy television series
English-language television shows